{{DISPLAYTITLE:L-Deoxyribose}}

-Deoxyribose is an organic compound with formula C5H10O4.  It is a synthetic monosaccharide, a stereoisomer (mirror image) of the natural compound -deoxyribose.

-Deoxyribose can be synthesized from -galactose . It has been used in chemical research, e.g. in the synthesis of mirror-image DNA.

References

Deoxy sugars
Aldopentoses